Routledge Approaches to History is a book series on historiography published by Routledge. The first book to be published in the series was Narrative Projections of a Black British History by Eva Ulrike Pirker of the University of Freiburg.

Titles
Narrative Projections of a Black British History. Eva Ulrike Pirker, 2011. 
Integrity and Historical Research. Edited by Tony Gibbons & Emily Sutherland, 2011. 
Frank Ankersmit's Lost Historical Cause: A Journey from Language to Experience. Peter Icke, 2011. 
Popularizing National Pasts: 1800 to the Present. Edited by Stefan Berger, Chris Lorenz & Billie Melman, 2012. 
Imprisoned by History: Aspects of Historicized Life. Martin L. Davies, 2009. 
History, Memory, and State-Sponsored Violence: Time and Justice. Berber Bevernage, 2011. 
The Fiction of History. Edited by Alexander Lyon Macfie, 2014. 
The Rise and Propagation of Historical Professionalism. Rolf Torstendahl, 2014. 
Modernity, Metatheory, and the Temporal-Spatial Divide: From Mythos to Techne. Michael Kimaid, 2015. 
The Material of World History. Edited by Tina Mai Chen & David S. Churchill, 2015. 
The Struggle for the Long-Term in Transnational Science and Politics: Forging the Future. Edited by Jenny Andersson & Eglė Rindzevičiūtė, 2015. 
'A New Type of History' Fictional proposals for dealing with the past. Beverley Southgate, 2015.

References

Series of history books
Routledge books